Jarak Island is an island in the straits of Malacca. It is administrated as part of Perak, Malaysia. The island is granitic, heavily forested, and has a rocky shoreline. Jarak has been described as being 8 hectares in size. 

The island is home to an endemic species of gecko, the Jarak Island bent-toed gecko (Cyrtodactylus jarakensis). The waters around the island host a number of coral reefs.

A notable, extensive survey of the island was documented by John Wyatt-Smith and Michael Tweedie in 1950, who were part of an expedition investigating scrub typhus on the island.

References 

Islands of Perak
Manjung District